Self-incompatibility (SI) is a general name for several genetic mechanisms that prevent self-fertilization in sexually reproducing organisms, and thus encourage outcrossing and allogamy. It is contrasted with separation of sexes among individuals (dioecy), and their various modes of spatial (herkogamy) and temporally (dichogamy) separation.

SI is best-studied and particularly common in flowering plants, although it is present in other groups, including sea squirts and fungi. In plants with SI, when a pollen grain produced in a plant reaches a stigma of the same plant or another plant with a matching allele or genotype, the process of pollen germination, pollen-tube growth, ovule fertilization, or embryo development is inhibited, and consequently no seeds are produced. SI is one of the most important means of preventing inbreeding and promoting the generation of new genotypes in plants and it is considered one of the causes of the spread and success of angiosperms on Earth.

Mechanisms of single-locus self-incompatibility
The best studied mechanisms of SI act by inhibiting the germination of pollen on stigmas, or the elongation of the pollen tube in the styles. These mechanisms are based on protein-protein interactions, and the best-understood mechanisms are controlled by a single locus termed S, which has many different alleles in the species population. Despite their similar morphological and genetic manifestations, these mechanisms have evolved independently, and are based on different cellular components; therefore, each mechanism has its own, unique S-genes.

The S-locus contains two basic protein coding regions – one expressed in the pistil, and the other in the anther and/or pollen (referred to as the female and male determinants, respectively). Because of their physical proximity, these are genetically linked, and are inherited as a unit. The units are called S-haplotypes.  The translation products of the two regions of the S-locus are two proteins which, by interacting with one another, lead to the arrest of pollen germination and/or pollen tube elongation, and thereby generate an SI response, preventing fertilization. However, when a female determinant interacts with a male determinant of a different haplotype, no SI is created, and fertilization ensues. This is a simplistic description of the general mechanism of SI, which is more complicated, and in some species the S-haplotype contains more than two protein coding regions.

Following is a detailed description of the different known mechanisms of SI in plants.

Gametophytic self-incompatibility (GSI)
In gametophytic self-incompatibility (GSI), the SI phenotype of the pollen is determined by its own gametophytic haploid genotype. This is the most common type of SI. Two different mechanisms of GSI have been described in detail at the molecular level, and their description follows.

The RNase mechanism
In this mechanism, pollen tube elongation is halted when it has proceeded approximately one third of the way through the style. The female component ribonuclease protein, termed S-RNase probably causes degradation of the ribosomal RNA (rRNA) inside the pollen tube, in the case of identical male and female S alleles, and consequently pollen tube elongation is arrested, and the pollen grain dies.

Within a decade of the initial confirmation their role in GSI, proteins belonging to the same RNase gene family were also found to cause pollen rejection in species of Rosaceae and Plantaginaceae. Despite initial uncertainty about the common ancestry of RNase-based SI in these distantly related plant families, phylogenetic studies and the finding of shared male determinants (F-box proteins) strongly supported homology across eudicots. Therefore, this mechanism likely arose approximately 90 million years ago, and is the inferred ancestral state for approximately 50% of all plant species.

In the past decade, the predictions about the wide distribution of this mechanism of SI have been confirmed, placing additional support of its single ancient origin. Specifically, a style-expressed T2/S-RNase gene and pollen-expressed F-box  genes are now implicated in causing SI among the members of Rubiaceae, Rutaceae, and Cactaceae. Therefore, other mechanisms of SI are thought to be recently derived in eudicots plants, in some cases relatively recently. One particularly interesting case is the Prunus SI systems, which functions through self-recognition (the cytotoxic activity of the S-RNAses is inhibited by default and selectively activated by the pollen partner SFB upon self-pollination), while SI in the other species with S-RNAse functions through non-self recognition (the S-RNAses are selectively detoxified upon cross-pollination).

The S-glycoprotein mechanism
In this mechanism, pollen growth is inhibited within minutes of its placement on the stigma. The mechanism is described in detail for Papaver rhoeas and so far appears restricted to the plant family Papaveraceae.

The female determinant is a small, extracellular molecule, expressed in the stigma; the identity of the male determinant remains elusive, but it is probably some cell membrane receptor. The interaction between male and female determinants transmits a cellular signal into the pollen tube, resulting in strong influx of calcium cations; this interferes with the intracellular concentration gradient of calcium ions which exists inside the pollen tube, essential for its elongation. The influx of calcium ions arrests tube elongation within 1–2 minutes. At this stage, pollen inhibition is still reversible, and elongation can be resumed by applying certain manipulations, resulting in ovule fertilization.

Subsequently, the cytosolic protein p26, a pyrophosphatase, is inhibited by phosphorylation, possibly resulting in arrest of synthesis of molecular building blocks, required for tube elongation. There is depolymerization and reorganization of actin filaments, within the pollen cytoskeleton. Within 10 minutes from the placement on the stigma, the pollen is committed to a process which ends in its death. At 3–4 hours past pollination, fragmentation of pollen DNA begins, and finally (at 10–14 hours), the cell dies apoptotically.

Sporophytic self-incompatibility (SSI)
In sporophytic self-incompatibility (SSI), the SI phenotype of the pollen is determined by the diploid genotype of the anther (the sporophyte) in which it was created. This form of SI was identified in the families: Brassicaceae, Asteraceae, Convolvulaceae, Betulaceae, Caryophyllaceae, Sterculiaceae and Polemoniaceae. Up to this day, only one mechanism of SSI has been described in detail at the molecular level, in Brassica (Brassicaceae).

Since SSI is determined by a diploid genotype, the pollen and pistil each express the translation products of two different alleles, i.e. two male and two female determinants. Dominance relationships often exist between pairs of alleles, resulting in complicated patterns of compatibility/self-incompatibility. These dominance relationships also allow the generation of individuals homozygous for a recessive S allele.

Compared to a population in which all S alleles are co-dominant, the presence of dominance relationships in the population, raises the chances of compatible mating between individuals. The frequency ratio between recessive and dominant S alleles, reflects a dynamic balance between reproductive assurance (favoured by recessive alleles) and avoidance of selfing (favoured by dominant alleles).

The SI mechanism in Brassica
As previously mentioned, the SI phenotype of the pollen is determined by the diploid genotype of the anther. In Brassica, the pollen coat, derived from the anther's tapetum tissue, carries the translation products of the two S alleles. These are small, cysteine-rich proteins. The male determinant is termed SCR or SP11, and is expressed in the anther tapetum as well as in the microspore and pollen (i.e. sporophytically). There are possibly up to 100 polymorphs of the S-haplotype in Brassica, and within these there is a dominance hierarchy.

The female determinant of the SI response in Brassica, is a transmembrane protein termed SRK, which has an intracellular kinase domain, and a variable extracellular domain. SRK is expressed in the stigma, and probably functions as a receptor for the SCR/SP11 protein in the pollen coat. Another stigmatic protein, termed SLG, is highly similar in sequence to the SRK protein, and seems to function as a co-receptor for the male determinant, amplifying the SI response.

The interaction between the SRK and SCR/SP11 proteins results in autophosphorylation of the intracellular kinase domain of SRK, and a signal is transmitted into the papilla cell of the stigma. Another protein essential for the SI response is MLPK, a serine-threonine kinase, which is anchored to the plasma membrane from its intracellular side. The downstream cellular and molecular events, leading eventually to pollen inhibition, are poorly described.

Other mechanisms of self-incompatibility
These mechanisms have received only limited attention in scientific research. Therefore, they are still poorly understood.

2-locus gametophytic self-incompatibility
The grass subfamily Pooideae, and perhaps all of the family Poaceae, have a gametophytic self-incompatibility system that involves two unlinked loci referred to as S and Z. If the alleles expressed at these two loci in the pollen grain both match the corresponding alleles in the pistil, the pollen grain will be recognized as incompatible.

Heteromorphic self-incompatibility

A distinct SI mechanism exists in heterostylous flowers, termed heteromorphic self-incompatibility. This mechanism is probably not evolutionarily related to the more familiar mechanisms, which are differentially defined as homomorphic self-incompatibility.

Almost all heterostylous taxa feature SI to some extent. The loci responsible for SI in heterostylous flowers, are strongly linked to the loci responsible for flower polymorphism, and these traits are inherited together. Distyly is determined by a single locus, which has two alleles; tristyly is determined by two loci, each with two alleles. Heteromorphic SI is sporophytic, i.e. both alleles in the male plant, determine the SI response in the pollen. SI loci always contain only two alleles in the population, one of which is dominant over the other, in both pollen and pistil. Variance in SI alleles parallels the variance in flower morphs, thus pollen from one morph can fertilize only pistils from the other morph. In tristylous flowers, each flower contains two types of stamens; each stamen produces pollen capable of fertilizing only one flower morph, out of the three existing morphs.

A population of a distylous plant contains only two SI genotypes: ss and Ss. Fertilization is possible only between genotypes; each genotype cannot fertilize itself. This restriction maintains a 1:1 ratio between the two genotypes in the population; genotypes are usually randomly scattered in space. Tristylous plants contain, in addition to the S locus, the M locus, also with two alleles. The number of possible genotypes is greater here, but a 1:1 ratio exists between individuals of each SI type.

Cryptic self-incompatibility (CSI)
Cryptic self-incompatibility (CSI) exists in a limited number of taxa (for example, there is evidence for CSI in Silene vulgaris, Caryophyllaceae). In this mechanism, the simultaneous presence of cross and self pollen on the same stigma, results in higher seed set from cross pollen, relative to self pollen. However, as opposed to 'complete' or 'absolute' SI, in CSI, self-pollination without the presence of competing cross pollen, results in successive fertilization and seed set; in this way, reproduction is assured, even in the absence of cross-pollination. CSI acts, at least in some species, at the stage of pollen tube elongation, and leads to faster elongation of cross pollen tubes, relative to self pollen tubes. The cellular and molecular mechanisms of CSI have not been described.

The strength of a CSI response can be defined, as the ratio of crossed to selfed ovules, formed when equal amounts of cross and self pollen, are placed upon the stigma; in the taxa described up to this day, this ratio ranges between 3.2 and 11.5.

Late-acting self-incompatibility (LSI)
Late-acting self-incompatibility (LSI) is also termed ovarian self-incompatibility (OSI). In this mechanism, self pollen germinates and reaches the ovules, but no fruit is set. LSI can be pre-zygotic (e.g. deterioration of the embryo sac prior to pollen tube entry, as in Narcissus triandrus) or post-zygotic (malformation of the zygote or embryo, as in certain species of Asclepias and in Spathodea campanulata).

The existence of the LSI mechanism among different taxa and in general, is subject for scientific debate. Criticizers claim, that absence of fruit set is due to genetic defects (homozygosity for lethal recessive alleles), which are the direct result of self-fertilization  (inbreeding depression). Supporters, on the other hand, argue for the existence of several basic criteria, which differentiate certain cases of LSI from the inbreeding depression phenomenon.

Self-compatibility (SC)
Self-compatibility (SC) is the absence of genetic mechanisms which prevent self-fertilization resulting in plants that can reproduce successfully via both self-pollen and pollen from other individuals. Approximately one half of angiosperm species are SI, the remainder being SC.  Mutations that disable SI (resulting in SC) may become common or entirely dominate in natural populations. Pollinator decline, variability in pollinator service, the so-called "automatic advantage" of self-fertilisation, among other factors, may favor the loss of SI. 

Many cultivated plants are SC, although there are notable exceptions, such as apples and Brassica oleracea. Human-mediated artificial selection through selective breeding is often responsible for SC these agricultural crops. SC enables more efficient breeding techniques to be employed for crop improvement. However, when genetically similar SI cultivars are bred, inbreeding depression can cause a cross-incompatible form of SC to arise, such as in apricots and almonds. In this rare, intraspecific, cross-incompatible mechanism, individuals have more reproductive success when self-pollinated rather than when cross-pollinated with other individuals of the same species. In wild populations, intraspecific cross-incompatibility has been observed in Nothoscordum bivalve.

See also 
 Allogamy
 Dichogamy
 Dimorphous flower
 Dioecy
 Heterosis
 Monocotyledon reproduction
 Outcrossing
 Plant sexuality
 Pollination
 Protandry

References

Further reading

External links
Self-Incompatibility: How Plants Avoid Inbreeding
Heterostyly in cowslip

Pollination
Plant reproduction
Population genetics
Plant sexuality